Valea Viei may refer to several villages in Romania:

 Valea Viei, a village in the town of Pătârlagele, Buzău County
 Valea Viei, a village in the town of Turceni, Gorj County
 Valea Viei, a village in Nicolae Bălcescu Commune, Vâlcea County

See also
Valea (disambiguation)